Etron Technology, Inc. (Traditional: 鈺創科技; Simplified: 钰创科技; Pinyin: Yu-Chuang Ke Ji) is a Taiwanese electronics company that produces dynamic RAM and systems-on-a-chip.

Founded in 1991 by Nicky Lu, the company did an initial public offering in 1998. In 2016, Etron did spinoffs of two subsidiaries: eEver Technology and eYs3D Microelectronics.

In 2020, Etron had been unprofitable for five years in a row and was "struggling to survive".

References 

Companies listed on the Taipei Exchange
Semiconductor companies of Taiwan
Taiwanese companies established in 1991